Jimmy Banks (September 2, 1964 – April 26, 2019) was an American soccer defender. After a standout career at the University of Wisconsin–Milwaukee, Banks spent six seasons playing indoor soccer with the Milwaukee Wave. He also earned 35 caps with the  national team between 1986 and 1991, including two games at the 1990 FIFA World Cup. After retiring from playing professionally, Banks entered the coaching ranks with both youth clubs and the Milwaukee School of Engineering men's team. Banks died of stomach cancer on April 26, 2019.

Youth and college
Born in Milwaukee, Banks began playing soccer at age six through a Salvation Army program near the city’s Westlawn Housing Projects. After graduating from Custer High School in Milwaukee, he attended first the University of Wisconsin–Parkside then the University of Wisconsin–Milwaukee where he earned All-American honors playing NCAA Division I soccer as first a forward, then a midfielder. At Milwaukee, Banks played for his future national team manager Bob Gansler.

Milwaukee Wave
After graduation from Milwaukee, he was drafted by both the Kansas City Comets of the Major Indoor Soccer League and the Milwaukee Wave of the American Indoor Soccer Association. He decided to remain in Milwaukee and signed with the Wave for whom he played from 1987 to 1993. He was a league All Star in 1992.

National team
He earned his first national team cap in a scoreless tie with Canada on February 5, 1986. He went on to play a total of 35 games with the senior team.  His national team highlights include starting two games of the 1990 FIFA World Cup against Italy and Austria; and playing as a member of the 1987 Pan American Games and World University Games soccer teams.

Banks and teammate Desmond Armstrong became the first two African-American players named to a U.S. World Cup squad when they made the 22-man roster for the 1990 World Cup.

Coaching
In 1999, he became the head coach of the Milwaukee School of Engineering men's soccer team, a position he held until his death in 2019. He also served as the director of coaching of the Milwaukee Kickers. While he retired from playing professionally, he continued playing with the Milwaukee Bavarians.

He remained a force in Milwaukee's inner city as a founder of an inner-city youth soccer camp and a full-time and volunteer worker with the Milwaukee Boy's and Girl's Club. His years of work with disadvantaged youth led to his being honored with the Community Spirit Award.

In 1999, the University of Wisconsin–Milwaukee inducted Banks into the school's Athletic Hall of Fame.

Death
On April 25, 2019, his son Demetrius "Dee" Banks announced that Banks was in "the final days of his battle with cancer." The following day, Banks died at the age of 54.

Stadium renaming
A soccer and football specific stadium across from Custer High School, was renamed from Custer Stadium to Jimmy Banks Stadium in early 2022. The renaming was introduced to the Committee on Accountability, Finance and Personnel through a campaign organized by Tim Clements and Corey Thompson, among others active in the Milwaukee soccer community.

References

External links
 Cached USSoccerPlayers.com bio
 

1964 births
2019 deaths
1990 FIFA World Cup players
American Indoor Soccer Association players
American soccer coaches
American soccer players
African-American soccer players
Association football defenders
Milwaukee Bavarians players
Milwaukee Wave players
National Professional Soccer League (1984–2001) players
Soccer players from Milwaukee
United States men's international soccer players
Footballers at the 1987 Pan American Games
Pan American Games competitors for the United States
Milwaukee Panthers men's soccer players
University of Wisconsin–Parkside alumni
Deaths from cancer in Wisconsin
Deaths from stomach cancer
20th-century African-American sportspeople
21st-century African-American people